Rederiaktiebolaget Eckerö is a Finnish holding company based at Mariehamn in Åland. The principal constituents of the group are:

 Birka Cruises, a company operating Baltic cruises from Stockholm in Sweden. Services terminated in 2020 and the only ship is laid up and offered for sale.
 Eckerö Line, a company operating car ferry services between Helsinki in Finland and Tallinn in Estonia.
 Eckerö Linjen, a company operating car ferry services between Berghamn in the Åland Islands and Grisslehamn in Sweden.
 Eckerö Shipping, a company providing freight shipment services between Finland and Sweden
 Williams Buss, a company providing bus services in the Åland Islands.

References

Bibliography

External links
 Company web site, English language version

Transport companies of Finland
Companies of Åland